David Kirkpatrick Este Bruce (February 12, 1898 – December 5, 1977) was an American diplomat, intelligence officer and politician. He served as ambassador to France, the Federal Republic of Germany, and the United Kingdom, the only American to be all three.

Background
Bruce was born in Baltimore, Maryland, to William Cabell Bruce and Louise Este (Fisher) Bruce (1864–1945). One of his three brothers was James Cabell Bruce. He studied for a year and a half at Princeton University. He dropped out to serve in the United States Army during World War I. At parental insistence, he then attended the University of Virginia School of Law (1919–1920) and the University of Maryland School of Law (1920–1921) without taking a degree before being admitted to the Maryland bar in November 1921.

Career

State service
Bruce served in the Maryland House of Delegates (1924–1926) and the Virginia House of Delegates (1939–1942).

Federal service
During World War II, Bruce headed the Europe branch of the Office of Strategic Services (OSS), a precursor to the Central Intelligence Agency (CIA), which was based in London and coordinated espionage activities behind enemy lines for the United States Armed Forces branches. Other OSS functions included the use of propaganda, subversion, and post-war planning. He observed the invasion of Normandy landing there the day after the initial invasion.

After leaving the OSS at the end of World War II, and before entering the diplomatic field, in 1948–1949 David Bruce was with the Economic Cooperation Administration which administered the Marshall Plan. It was during this time that David Bruce and his new 2nd wife became an early member of the informal Georgetown Set within D.C.

Bruce, as a member of the new President's Board of Consultants on Foreign Intelligence Activities, wrote a secret report on the CIA's covert operations for President Dwight D. Eisenhower in 1956 that was highly critical of its operation under Allen Dulles's leadership.

Diplomatic service
He served as the United States Ambassador to France from 1949 to 1952, United States Ambassador to West Germany from 1957 to 1959, and United States Ambassador to the United Kingdom from 1961 to 1969. He was an American envoy at the Paris peace talks between the United States and North Vietnam in 1970 and 1971. Bruce also served as the first United States emissary to the People's Republic of China from 1973 to 1974. He was the ambassador to the North Atlantic Treaty Organization from late 1974 to 1976.

Bruce served as the Honorary Chair on the Board of Trustees of the American School in London during his diplomatic career in the United Kingdom.

President John F. Kennedy (1961–1963) appointed Bruce as ambassador to the Court of St James's (i.e. the United Kingdom). After Kennedy's death President Lyndon B. Johnson (1963–1969) kept Bruce but ignored all his recommendations. Bruce sought closer ties with Britain and greater European unity. Bruce's reports regarding Britain's financial condition were pessimistic and alarmist. With regard to Vietnam, Bruce privately questioned U.S. involvement and constantly urged the Johnson administration to allow Britain more of a role in bringing the conflict to an end.

Personal life and death
On May 29, 1926, Bruce married Ailsa Mellon, the daughter of the banker and diplomat Andrew W. Mellon. They divorced on April 20, 1945. Their only daughter, Audrey, and her husband, Stephen Currier, were presumed dead when a plane in which they were flying in the Caribbean disappeared on January 17, 1967, after requesting permission to fly over Culebra, a U. S. Navy installation. No trace of the plane, pilot, or passengers was ever found. Audrey and Stephen Currier left three children: Andrea, Lavinia, and Michael.

He married Evangeline Bell (1914–1995) on April 23, 1945, three days after his divorce. She was a granddaughter of Sir Herbert Conyers Surtees, a niece of Sir Patrick Ramsay, a stepdaughter of Ambassador Sir James Leishman Dodds, and the elder sister of Virginia Surtees (who married, and divorced, Sir Henry Ashley Clarke, the British Ambassador to Italy). They had two sons and one daughter, Alexandra (called Sasha). Alexandra died under mysterious circumstances (possibly murder or suicide) in 1975 at age 29 at the Bruce family home in Virginia.

Bruce purchased and restored Staunton Hill, his family's former estate in Charlotte County, Virginia.

He died on December 5, 1977 of a heart attack at Georgetown University Medical Center. He was buried at Oak Hill Cemetery in Washington, D.C.

Awards
Bruce received the Presidential Medal of Freedom, with Distinction, in 1976.

Legacy
The David K.E. Bruce Award was established in 2007 at the American School in London.

Publications
Bruce wrote a book of biographical essays on the American presidents originally published as Seven Pillars of the Republic (1936).  He later expanded it as Revolution to Reconstruction (1939) and again revised it as Sixteen American Presidents (1962).

See also
 William Cabell Bruce 
 James Cabell Bruce
 List of people who disappeared mysteriously at sea

References

Further reading

 Colman, Jonathan. "The London Ambassadorship of David KE Bruce During the Wilson-Johnson Years, 1964–68." Diplomacy and Statecraft 15.2 (2004): 327-352. online
Lankford, Nelson D. The Last American Aristocrat: The Biography of David K. E. Bruce, 1898–1977 (1996).
Lankford, Nelson D., ed. OSS against the Reich: The World War II Diaries of Colonel David K. E. Bruce (1991).
 Young, John W. "David K. E. Bruce, 1961–69." in The Embassy in Grosvenor Square (Palgrave Macmillan, London, 2012), 153-170.

External links
First Chapter of 'The Last American Aristocrat' published by the Washington Post with permission of the author
Review of the book, "The Last American Aristocrat" from The Washington Monthly magazine
Oral history interview with David K. E. Bruce, 1 March 1972, at the Truman Presidential Museum and Library
 David K. E. Bruce's archives at the "Fondation Jean Monnet"

1898 births
1970s missing person cases
1977 deaths
20th-century American diplomats
Ambassadors of the United States to China
Ambassadors of the United States to France
Ambassadors of the United States to Germany
Ambassadors of the United States to the United Kingdom
American Episcopalians
Burials at Oak Hill Cemetery (Washington, D.C.)
Maryland lawyers
Mellon family
Members of the Maryland House of Delegates
Members of the Virginia House of Delegates
People from Charlotte County, Virginia
Permanent Representatives of the United States to NATO
Politicians from Baltimore
Presidential Medal of Freedom recipients
United States Under Secretaries of State
University of Virginia School of Law alumni